Elections were held in the organized municipalities in the Thunder Bay District of Ontario on October 27, 2014 in conjunction with municipal elections across the province.

Conmee

Dorion

Gillies

Greenstone

Manitouwadge

Marathon

Neebing

Nipigon

O'Connor

Oliver Paipoonge

Red Rock

Schreiber

Shuniah

Terrace Bay

Thunder Bay

References 

Thunder Bay
Thunder Bay District